The OCN Storm (short for Opaskwayak Cree Nation Storm) are a Canadian junior B ice hockey team based in Opaskwayak Cree Nation, Manitoba. They are members of the Keystone Junior Hockey League and play out of the Gordon Lathlin Memorial Centre.

History 
OCN Storm were founded in 2012. They are the second junior hockey franchise to play in OCN, the first being the OCN Blizzard of the Manitoba Junior Hockey League. In their opening season, the Storm won just two games out of 36, finishing last in the league standings, thus missing the playoffs. The following season they improved their record to 12–21–0–1, finishing third in the new four-team North Division. They fell in the first round of the playoffs being swept by the Arborg Ice Dawgs.

In their third season of 2014–15 the Storm finished fifth in the league and won their first-ever playoff series against the North Winnipeg Satelites. OCN was eliminated in the second round by the Peguis Juniors.

The league again split into two divisions for 2015-2016 season. OCN Storm met up with the Juniors in a rematch of the previous season, coming out short dropping the series 4 games to 2.

In the 2016-2017 season the Storm clinched the newly realigned North Division. After eliminating the Cross Lake Islanders in four games OCN were knocked out in the second round by the Central Division winner Arborg Ice Dawgs.

The Storm repeated as North Division champs in 2017-2018, but were eliminated by the Arborg Ice Dawgs in the quarterfinals. Two veterans (Ethan Stuckless and Bryce Young) advanced to play in the CJHL with the Red Lake Miners following their season with the Storm. Both had their success in the SIJHL with Young posting 101 points on his way to being nominated as a CJHL Top Rookie finalist.

In the 2018-2019 season the OCN Storm were one of the four active teams in the Keystone Junior Hockey League. The Storm finished second in the league, but were upset in the semifinals by the Peguis Juniors losing the series 3 games to 2.

Season-by-season record

See also

List of ice hockey teams in Manitoba

References

External links
OCN Storm website
KJHL website

Ice hockey teams in Manitoba
2012 establishments in Manitoba